Werner Günthör (born 1 June 1961 in Uttwil) is a former Swiss track and field athlete, who was the best shot putter in the history of Swiss track and field.

Biography
Günthör won three straight World Championships, 1987, 1991, and 1993, as well as one European Championship in 1986.  At the 1988 Summer Olympics in Seoul he won the bronze medal.

His personal best throw, and Swiss record, was 22.75 metres, achieved in August 1988 in Bern.

The 2.00 meter tall athlete also competed in the bobsleigh.  He trained to be a sanitation installer but later completed study in sports and works today as a sport teacher and track and field coach.  He is married and lives in Erlach.

References

External links

1961 births
Living people
Swiss male shot putters
Athletes (track and field) at the 1984 Summer Olympics
Athletes (track and field) at the 1988 Summer Olympics
Athletes (track and field) at the 1992 Summer Olympics
Olympic athletes of Switzerland
Olympic bronze medalists for Switzerland
Swiss male bobsledders
World Athletics Championships medalists
European Athletics Championships medalists
People from Arbon District
Medalists at the 1988 Summer Olympics
Olympic bronze medalists in athletics (track and field)
World Athletics Championships athletes for Switzerland
World Athletics Indoor Championships medalists
World Athletics Indoor Championships winners
World Athletics Championships winners
Sportspeople from Thurgau
20th-century Swiss people